West Padang is a subdistrict (kecamatan) in the city of Padang, West Sumatra, Indonesia. In the administrative area of this district, West Sumatra, the governor's office and the hall town Padang is located.

Padang